The Little Rock Police Department (LRPD), is the primary law enforcement agency for  Little Rock, Arkansas in the United States.

History

In 1831 the Town of Little Rock was incorporated and Dr. Matthew Cunningham won the first mayoral election. In 1835 Little Rock was incorporated as the first City in the Arkansas Territory. The Little Rock Police Department was established in 1866 and in 1892 the first paid Little Rock Fire Department was created.

Civil rights era

The Little Rock Police placed barriers around Little Rock Central High School during the anti-integration riots against the Little Rock Nine. During the integration of the school, the Arkansas National Guard was called in to prevent the Nine from entering the school. Governor Faubus was persuaded by President Eisenhower to remove the guard, and at the time of their removal, the Little Rock Police Department took over the situation and attempted to escort the Nine into the school. Due to the rioting, the police were forced to evacuate the students. Eventually, the 101st Airborne Division was called in by Eisenhower to bring order to the situation.

In 2003, the son of Elizabeth Eckford, who was one of the Nine, was killed by Little Rock Police after pointing an assault rifle at them: she described it as "suicide by police". According to an LRPD officer, he had mental health issues.

Little Rock Police arrested the Freedom Riders when they entered the city in 1957.

In 1978 a group of officers filed suit against the LRPD for racial discrimination. The court ultimately found in favor of LRPD.

Misconduct
In 1988, Police Chief Jess F. ″Doc″ Hale was arrested after stealing less than $200 from a drug store register. After being suspended, he committed suicide.

In January 2011, Officer Jason Gilbert and two other officers from nearby agencies were indicted for a conspiracy to rob an armored car. The charges included a failed September 10, 2007 attempt to rob an armored car.  In March 2012, Gilbert was sentenced to three and a half years in prison.

In February 2011, Officer Rick Harmon was arrested for drunk driving.

In May 2012 two officers, Mark Anthony Jones and Randall Tremayn Robinson, were arrested after helping to facilitate drug deals while on duty.

Josh Hastings
In September 2012, Officer Josh Hastings was charged with manslaughter in the shooting death of fifteen-year-old Bobby Moore. According to the charging documents, Moore was shot in the head as he was backing away from the officer trying to flee in a stolen car. Officer Hastings had been on the force for five years and had been suspended six times previously. In April, 2014, after two deadlocked juries, charges were dropped as prosecutors said no jury was willing to convict Hastings. He had been fired from his job, but his lawyer said he would take steps to return to the department. Later investigation revealed that Hastings was hired in spite of internal objections of Hastings having once attended a Ku Klux Klan meeting and lying about it on his application. During his tenure at LRPD, Hastings used force an estimated 63 times and collected over 30 disciplinary citations, for actions such as "sleeping on the job, abusive language, failure to file reports, failure to appear in court, failure to notify authorities of a dead body, conduct unbecoming an officer, insubordination, and untruthfulness", as well as reckless driving.

SWAT operation
In early 2019, press reports indicated that the department serves all search warrants with a SWAT unit. Most drug-related warrants are "no-knock," meaning the police can use explosives to enter a home without warning.

Rank structure

The Little Rock Police Department has various positions for detectives, Field Training Officers, and other mission specific assignments, but these are not considered official ranks by the department.

Organization
The department is organized into a number of divisions. These are:
Executive Bureau
Headquarters
Training Division
Communications Division
Investigative Bureau
Records and Support Division
Major Crimes Division
Investigative Bureau
Special Investigations Division
Field Services Bureau
Special Operations Division
Patrol Division
12th Street Patrol
Northwest Patrol
Southwest Patrol

Fallen officers

References

Government of Little Rock, Arkansas
1866 establishments in Arkansas
Municipal police departments of Arkansas